Sphenarium purpurascens ( and , i.e., corn-field grasshopper), is a grasshopper species in the genus Sphenarium found in Mexico and Guatemala.

The harvesting of the grasshoppers in Mexico for human consumption can be a way for managing pest outbreaks. Such strategies allow decreased use of pesticide and create a source of income for farmers.

References

External links 

Caelifera
Insects described in 1842
Edible insects
Taxa named by Toussaint de Charpentier